The 2009 SuperLiga was the third edition of the SuperLiga. The top four overall Major League Soccer teams from the 2008 season not already qualified for the CONCACAF Champions League earned qualification, as well as four clubs from the Mexican Primera División. All games of the tournament were broadcast live on Fox Sports World in Canada, Telefutura in the United States, and Televisa and TV Azteca in Mexico and an internet stream on the SuperLiga website. UANL won their first title after beating Chicago Fire 4–3 on penalties in the final.

Qualification

The teams involved were selected based on qualification rules set by their respective leagues.

On November 21, 2008, MLS announced that for the 2009 tournament, the top four teams in the 2008 MLS regular season standings not competing in the CONCACAF Champions League in 2009–10 would qualify for SuperLiga 2009. That ruling means that the top two teams from the 2008 MLS season, the Columbus Crew and the Houston Dynamo, who had already qualified for the 2009–10 CONCACAF Champions League, were not eligible to participate in the Superliga 2009.

On May 14, 2009, FMF announced that for the 2009 tournament the top four eligible teams from the Clausura 2008 and Apertura 2008 overall season standings not competing in the CONCACAF Champions League would qualify for SuperLiga 2009. That ruling meant that the Apertura-08 Champion Toluca and the runner-up Cruz Azul (2008 3rd and 4th overall respectively), who had already qualified for the 2009–10 CONCACAF Champions League, were not eligible to participate in the tournament. UNAM (6th overall) were also ineligible, while Guadalajara (2nd overall) declined to participate.

The SuperLiga 2009 participants were:

From  Major League Soccer:

 Chicago Fire (2008 3rd overall)
 New England Revolution (2008 4th overall)
 Chivas USA (2008 5th overall)
 Kansas City Wizards (2008 6th overall)

From  Mexican Primera División:

 San Luis (2008 1st overall)
 Santos Laguna (2008 5th overall)
 UANL (2008 7th overall)
 Atlas (2008 8th overall)

Group stage
There were two groups of four teams. Each group contained two clubs from each league with the top two teams from each groups advancing to the semifinals.

Group A

Group B

Knockout stage

Bracket

Semifinals

Final

Goalscorers
3 goals
 Armando Pulido ( UANL)
2 goals

 Cuauhtémoc Blanco ( Chicago Fire)
 Kheli Dube ( New England Revolution)
 Itamar ( UANL)
 Kenny Mansally ( New England Revolution)
 Brian McBride ( Chicago Fire)
 José Rodolfo Reyes ( San Luis)
 Juan Pablo Rodríguez ( Santos Laguna)
 Matías Vuoso ( Santos Laguna)

1 goal

 Jesús Dueñas ( UANL)
 Juan Pablo García ( UANL)
 Atiba Harris ( Chivas USA)
 Jay Heaps ( New England Revolution))
 Agustín Herrera ( Santos Laguna)
 Francisco Fonseca ( UANL)
 Edgaras Jankauskas ( New England Revolution)
 Michael Lahoud ( Chivas USA)
 Jeff Larentowicz ( New England Revolution)
 Claudio López ( Kansas City)
 Braulio Luna ( San Luis)
 Justin Mapp ( Chicago Fire)
 Jesús Molina ( UANL)
 Alfredo Moreno ( San Luis)
 Patrick Nyarko (  Chicago Fire)
 Carlos Quintero ( Santos Laguna)
 Francisco Javier Torres ( Santos Laguna)

References

External links
 SuperLiga 2009 Official site

2009
2009 in American soccer
Super